Triumph of Love is a musical with a book by James Magruder, lyrics by Susan Birkenhead, and music by Jeffrey Stock.

Overview
Resembling a chamber musical more than a traditional book musical, it is based on the 1732 Pierre de Marivaux commedia dell'arte play Le Triomphe de l'Amour and centers on Spartan princess Léonide, whose love for Agis is complicated by the fact her throne was wrongfully wrested by her family from the object of her affection. Agis has been raised an educated man ruled by reason rather than passion by his uncle Hermocrates and his aunt Hesione. The princess, conspiring with her servant Corine, disguises herself as Phocion in order to infiltrate the guarded "men-only" palace compound occupied by Agis, who is plotting her assassination. Complications ensue when both Agis and Hermocrates separately guess her secret, and she tells the former she's Cécile, on the lam from an undesirable paramour, and to the latter claims to be Aspasie, who wishes to study philosophy with him. Adding to the convoluted plot are Hermocrates' valet Harlequin and gardener Dimas.

Production
Triumph of Love opened on  Broadway on October 23, 1997 at the Royale Theatre, where it ran for 85 performances and 30 previews. The musical was directed by Michael Mayer and choreographed by Doug Varone. The cast included Susan Egan as Léonide, Christopher Sieber as Agis, F. Murray Abraham as Hermocrates, Betty Buckley as Hesione, Nancy Opel as Corine, Roger Bart as Harlequin, and Kevin Chamberlin as Dimas. Comedian Elayne Boosler had been announced to play Corine but dropped out during rehearsals due to creative differences.

An original cast recording was released by Jay Records. As a bonus track, it included Buckley's cut solo from Act II, "If I Cannot Love."

Songs
Source:

Act I
 This Day of Days - Hesione, Harlequin, Agis, and Hermocrates
 Anything - Princess Leonide
 Classic Clown - Harlequin
 The Bond that Can't Be Broken - Princess Leonide, Agis
 Mr. Right - Corine, Harlequin
 You May Call Me Phocion - Princess Leonide, Hesione
 Mr. Right (Reprise) - Corine, Dimas
 Emotions - Hermocrates, Princess Leonide
 The Sad and Sordid Saga of Cécile - Princess Leonide, Agis, Corine, Harlequin, Dimas
 Serenity - Hesione
 Issue in Question - Agis
 Teach Me Not to Love You - The Company

Act II
 Have A Little Faith - Corine, Princess Leonide, Harlequin, Dimas
 The Tree - Hesione, Hermocrates
 What Have I Done? - Princess Leonide
 Henchmen Are Forgotten - Harlequin, Dimas, Corine
 Love Won't Take No For An Answer - Hermocrates, Hesione, Agis
 This Day of Days (Reprise) - Princess Leonide, Agis, Corine, Harlequin, Dimas

Critical response
The Variety reviewer called the musical "Modest in everything but talent and charm, this chamber-size comedy just might have the sass to take its place alongside the season’s big-budget lions."

Original Broadway production

See also
The Triumph of Love (2001 film), a film based on the same story

References

External links
 Internet Broadway Database listing
 Triumph of Love at MTI Shows
 New York Times review 

1997 musicals
Broadway musicals